Great Dome may refer to:

 Great Dome (MIT), a building on the Massachusetts Institute of Technology campus
 Great Dome (railcar), a type of lounge car built by the Budd Company